Ilkka Uimonen (born 1966) is a Finnish photographer who has worked as a photojournalist. Uimonen's book Cycles, on Israeli–Palestinian violence, was published in 2004. He has won awards from Pictures of the Year International and World Press Photo.

Life and work

Uimonen has been a photographer since the early 1990s. He became a nominee member of Magnum Photos in 2002; he is no longer a member. He has worked as a contract photographer for Newsweek.

Publications

Publications by Uimonen
Cycles. London: Trolley, 2004. .

Publications with others
Off Broadway: Magnum Photographers: Christopher Anderson, Antoine D'Agata, Thomas Dworzak, Alex Majoli, Paolo Pellegrin, Ilkka Uimonen. London: Trolley, 2009. .

Short films
Regarding lower Manhattan (2014) – documentary, 25 mins

Exhibitions
Nazar - Western eyes, Noorderlicht, Groningen, Netherlands, September–October 2004.
Off Broadway, New York City, 2004; Rencontres d'Arles, Arles, France, 2005. With Thomas Dworzak, Alex Majoli and Paolo Pellegrin.
Statue, part of Red Fall, Station Museum of Contemporary Art, Houston, TX, October 2004 – February 2005. With others.

Awards
Second prize stories, General News category, World Press Photo, 2000 contest
First Place, General Division / News Picture Story, 58th Pictures of the Year International, 2001, for "The Visit"
Third Place, General Division / General News, 58th Pictures of the Year International, 2001, for "Ariel Sharon Visit"
Award of Excellence, Magazine Division / Global News, 58th Pictures of the Year International, 2001, for "Chest"
Award of Excellence, Magazine Division / Issue Reporting Picture Story, 58th Pictures of the Year International, 2001, for "Water Crisis in India"
Second prize stories, Spot News category, World Press Photo, 2003 contest
First Place, 60th Pictures of the Year International, 2003, for "Palestinian Informer's Fate"
Third prize stories, Spot News category, World Press Photo, 2004 contest

References

External links

1966 births
Living people
Finnish photographers
Photojournalists
Magnum photographers